The Lion of Babylon is an ancient Babylonian symbol.

History

Antiquity 
The Lion of Babylon symbolically represented the King of Babylon.

The depiction is based on the Mesopotamian lion, which used to roam in the region.

It represents Ishtar, goddess of fertility, love, and war.

Modern 
The lion featured as the dexter supporter on the coat of arms of Iraq from 1932–1959.

Gallery

See also 
Star of Ishtar
Ziggurat
Lion of Babylon (statue)
Lion of Judah

References

External links

Babylon
Mythological lions
National symbols of Iraq
Lions in heraldry

ar:أسد بابل
bg:Асад Бабил
es:T-72 León de Babilonia
it:Lion of Babylon
ms:Kereta kebal Singa Babylon